This is the order of battle for the American Expeditionary Force at the beginning and end of the Meuse-Argonne Offensive, September 26 to November 11, 1918.

Beginning of the battle (September 26, 1918)

First U.S. Army 
General John J. Pershing, Commanding

I Corps

Major General Hunter Liggett, Commanding

 28th Division (Maj. Gen. Charles H. Muir)
 35th Division (Maj. Gen. Peter E. Traub)
 77th Division (Maj. Gen. Robert Alexander)
 Reserve: 92nd Division (Maj. Gen. Charles C. Ballou)

III Corps
Major General Robert Lee Bullard, Commanding

 4th Division (Maj. Gen. John L. Hines)
 33rd Division (Maj. Gen. George Bell)
 80th Division (Maj. Gen. Adelbert Cronkhite)
 Reserve: 3rd Division (Maj. Gen. Beaumont B. Buck)

V Corps
Major General George H. Cameron, Commanding

 37th Division (Maj. Gen. Charles S. Farnsworth)
 79th Division (Maj. Gen. Joseph E. Kuhn)
 91st Division (Maj. Gen. William H. Johnston)
 Reserve: 32nd Division (Maj. Gen. William G. Haan)

In Reserve

 1st Division (Maj. Gen.  Charles P. Summerall)
 29th Division (Maj. Gen. Charles G. Morton)
 82nd Division (Brig. Gen. William P. Burnham)

End of the battle (November 10, 1918)
General John J. Pershing, Army Group Commander

First U.S. Army 
Lieutenant General Hunter Liggett, Commanding

I Corps
Major General Joseph T. Dickman, Commanding

 42nd Division (Maj. Gen. Charles T. Menoher until Nov 7, Maj. Gen. Charles Dudley Rhodes until Nov 10, Brig. Gen. Douglas MacArthur)
 77th Division (Maj. Gen. Robert Alexander)
 78th Division (Maj. Gen. James H. McRae)

III Corps
Major General John L. Hines, Commanding

 3rd Division (Brig. Gen. Preston Brown)
 5th Division (Maj. Gen. Hanson E. Ely)
 32nd Division (Maj. Gen. William G. Haan)
 90th Division (Maj. Gen. Henry T. Allen)

V Corps
Major General Charles P. Summerall, Commanding

 1st Division (Brig. Gen. Frank Parker)
 2nd Division (Maj. Gen. John A. Lejeune)
 29th Division (Maj. Gen. Charles G. Morton)
 80th Division (Maj. Gen. Adelbert Cronkhite)
 89th Division

Second U.S. Army 
Lieutenant General Robert L. Bullard, Commanding

IV Corps
Major General Charles H. Muir, Commanding

 4th Division (Maj. Gen. Mark L. Hersey)
 28th Division (Maj. Gen. William H. Hay)
 37th Division (Maj. Gen. Charles S. Farnsworth)

VI Corps 
Major General Charles C. Ballou, Commanding(Note: With the exception of one brigade from the 88th Division, VI Corps did not actively participate in the battle.)

 7th Division
 88th Division
 92nd Division

French II Colonial Corps

 French Division
 French Division
 26th Division
 79th Division

French XVII Corps

 French Division
 French Division
 33rd Division
 35th Division

List of divisions engaged 
At one point or another during the 47-day battle, all or part of 23 American divisions were engaged in the fighting:

 1st Division 
 2nd Division 
 3rd Division 
 4th Division 
 5th Division 
 26th Division 
 28th Division 
 29th Division 
 32nd Division 
 33rd Division 
 35th Division 
 36th Division
 37th Division 
 42nd Division 
 77th Division 
 78th Division 
 79th Division 
 80th Division 
 81st Division
 82nd Division 
 88th Division 
 89th Division 
 90th Division 
 91st Division
 92nd Division

References 

World War I orders of battle
Conflicts in 1918